Claire Lacey is a former England women's international footballer who played for West Ham United. Lacey is notable for being the first West ham player to win a cap for England.

References

Living people
West Ham United F.C. Women players
English women's footballers
England women's international footballers
Women's association football goalkeepers
Year of birth missing (living people)